Daniel Dociu is a Romanian video game art director and concept artist. He was the chief art director for NCsoft North America and also worked for its subsidiary ArenaNet until February 2017.

Dociu was born in Cluj. He obtained his master's degree in industrial design at the Fine Arts Academy in Cluj in 1982. Throughout the decade, he taught at the academy as an assistant professor and later worked as a graphic designer in Athens, Greece, a product designer and a freelance artist. He moved to the United States in 1990. From 1992 to 2003, Dociu did work for various video game developers including Square, Electronic Arts, and Zipper Interactive.

His face was also used for reference for the character Father Grigori in the critically acclaimed video game Half-Life 2.

His son, Horia Dociu, is also an artist and Art Director for the video game company Sucker Punch Productions and will replace him as the chief art director for NCsoft North America.

Awards 
Spectrum, The Best In Contemporary Fantastic Art
 Spectrum 19, Silver Medal, Concept Art
 Spectrum 17, Gold Medal, Concept Art
 Spectrum 16, Gold Medal, Concept Art
 Spectrum 15, Gold and Silver Medal, Concept Art
 Spectrum 14, Gold Medal, Concept Art
 Spectrum 13, Silver Medal, Concept Art
 Spectrum 13-19, numerous pieces published

Lürzer's Archive
 200 Best Illustrators Worldwide 2011–2012
 200 Best Illustrators Worldwide 2009–2010
Into The Pixel
 2012 gallery show selection, one/16 pieces
 2010 gallery show selection, one/16 pieces
 2009 gallery show selection, one/16 pieces
 2008 Judging Panel
 2007 gallery show selection, one/16 pieces
 2006 gallery show selection, two/16 pieces

EXPOSÉ, Ballistic Annual
 EXPOSÉ 9, Grand Master, Career Achievement
Past honorees: Syd Mead, H R Giger, Ralph McQuarrie
 EXPOSÉ 7,
Master Award, Concept Art
Cover Illustration, Limited Edition
 EXPOSÉ 6,
Master Award, Environment Art
Excellence Award, Science Fiction Art
 EXPOSÉ 5,
Master Award, Transport Art
Excellence Award, Creature Design
Excellence Award, Science Fiction Art
Excellence Award, Concept Art
Excellence Award, Environment art
 EXPOSÉ 4,
Master Award, Best Environment
Master Award, Best City-scape

Works 
Crimson Skies: High Road to Revenge
FIFA Soccer 95
FIFA Soccer 96
FIFA Soccer 2002
Guild Wars 2
Guild Wars: Eye of the North
Guild Wars Factions
Guild Wars Nightfall
Guild Wars Prophecies
James Bond 007: Everything or Nothing
James Bond 007: Nightfire
Half-Life 2
MechWarrior 3
MechWarrior: Pirates' Moon
Need for Speed: Hot Pursuit 2
Recoil
ReBoot
Secret of Evermore
Shadow Madness (as Worlds Within)
SOCOM U.S. Navy SEALs
SSX Tricky
SSX 3
Triple Play 2003

References

External links 
 Daniel Dociu's art website
 Daniel Dociu's Gallery with biography and artbooks on Inside Your ART
 Daniel Dociu on Facebook

Year of birth missing (living people)
Living people
Romanian illustrators
People from Redmond, Washington
Video game artists